"Mon Pays" is a 2006 song recorded by French-born artist Faudel. It was the first single from his album Mundial Corrida, produced by Fred Chateau and Volodia. Released on 13 November 2006, the song was a huge hit in France and Belgium (Wallonia).

Song information
In this song, Faudel affirms his double French and Algerian identity and  celebrates his two cultures. This song received extensive airplay on radio and TV (number 29 on the 2006 Airplay Chart and number 19 on the TV Chart). In France, the single debuted directly at number one on 11 November 2006, then dropped and remained for ten weeks in the top ten and 38 weeks on the chart. As of August 2014, it is the 66th best-selling single of the 21st century in France, with 356,000 units sold. In Belgium, "Mon Pays" ranked for 28 weeks in the top 40, 18 of them in the top ten and one week atop.

Track listings
 CD single
 "Mon Pays" (radio) — 3:45
 "Mon Pays" (remix) — 3:44

 Digital download
 "Mon Pays" (radio) — 3:45
 "Mon Pays" (remix) — 3:44
 "Mon Pays" (karaoke) — 3:48

Charts

Weekly charts

Year-end charts

Certifications

References

2006 singles
Faudel songs
Ultratop 50 Singles (Wallonia) number-one singles
SNEP Top Singles number-one singles